Jesus College is one of the constituent colleges of the University of Oxford in England.  The college was founded in 1571 by Queen Elizabeth I at the request of Hugh Price, a Welsh clergyman, who was Treasurer of St David's Cathedral in Pembrokeshire. The college still has strong links with Wales, and about 15% of students are Welsh. There are 340 undergraduates and 190 students carrying out postgraduate studies. Women have been admitted since 1974, when the college was one of the first five men's colleges to become co-educational. Old members of Jesus College are sometimes known as "Jesubites".

Harold Wilson studied at Jesus College from 1934 to 1937, and was later the Prime Minister of the United Kingdom during two periods (from October 1964 to June 1970, and from March 1974 to April 1976). More than 30 other Members of Parliament (MPs) have been educated at the college, from Sir John Salusbury who was elected as MP for Denbighshire in 1601 to Theresa Villiers who was elected as MP for Chipping Barnet in 2005.  Sir Leoline Jenkins, who became a Fellow and later the Principal of the college, was Secretary of State for the Northern Department from 1680 to 1681 and Secretary of State for the Southern Department from 1681 to 1685. Sir William Williams served as Speaker of the House of Commons from 1680 to 1685 and as Solicitor General for England and Wales from 1687 to 1689. Evan Cotton was MP for Finsbury East before holding the position of President of the Bengal Legislative Council from 1922 to 1925.  Several Welsh politicians have been educated at the college, some representing constituencies in Wales (such as Sir John Wogan, representing Pembrokeshire at various times between 1614 and 1644) and others working outside Parliament, such as D. J. Williams, a co-founder of the Welsh nationalist party Plaid Cymru.

Other students at the college have subsequently held political offices in other countries. Norman Manley was Chief Minister of Jamaica from 1955 to 1962.  P. T. Rajan was Chief Minister of Madras Presidency between April and August 1936. Heather Wilson was the first Old Member of the college to sit in the United States House of Representatives, where she represented New Mexico's 1st congressional district from 1998 to 2009.  The Australian politician Neal Blewett was a member of the Australian House of Representatives from 1977 to 1994, a Government Minister from 1983 to 1994 and High Commissioner to the UK from 1994 to 1998. Pixley ka Isaka Seme, who studied for a BCL between 1906 and 1909, was one of the founder members of the African National Congress.

Several prominent judges and lawyers were educated at the college. Viscount Sankey, who was Lord Chancellor from 1929 to 1935, studied for a BA in History and BCL between 1885 and 1891. Lord du Parcq was appointed as a Lord of Appeal in Ordinary in 1946. Sir Richard Richards became Lord Chief Baron of the Exchequer in 1817. The Scottish MP and lawyer Lord Murray was appointed a Senator of the College of Justice in 1979.  The solicitor Sir David Lewis was Lord Mayor of the City of London from 2007 to 2008.  Other lawyers who studied at the college include James Chadwin QC, who defended the Yorkshire Ripper, and Sir Arthur James, who prosecuted the Great Train Robbers and later became a judge of the Court of Appeal.  Academic lawyers include J Duncan M Derrett, Professor of Oriental Laws in the University of London from 1965 to 1982, and Alfred Hazel, Reader in English Law at All Souls College, Oxford.

Alumni
Abbreviations used in the following tables
 M – Year of matriculation at Jesus College (a dash indicates that the individual did not matriculate at the college)
 G – Year of graduation / conclusion of study at Jesus College (a dash indicates that the individual graduated from another college)
 DNG – Did not graduate: left the college without taking a degree
 ? – Year unknown; an approximate year is used for table-sorting purposes.
 (F/P) after name – later became a Fellow or Principal of Jesus College, and included on the list of Principals and Fellows
 (HF) after name – later became an Honorary Fellow of Jesus College, and included on the list of Honorary Fellows

Degree abbreviations
 Undergraduate degree: BA – Bachelor of Arts
 Postgraduate degrees:
 BCL – Bachelor of Civil Law
 MA – Master of Arts
 MPhil – Master of Philosophy
 DCL – Doctor of Civil Law
 DPhil – Doctor of Philosophy

The subject studied and the degree classification are included, where known.  Until the early 19th century, undergraduates read for a Bachelor of Arts degree that included study of Latin and Greek texts, mathematics, geometry, philosophy and theology.  Individual subjects at undergraduate level were only introduced later: for example, Mathematics (1805), Natural Science (1850), Jurisprudence (1851, although it had been available before this to students who obtained special permission), Modern History (1851) and Theology (1871). Geography and Modern Languages were introduced in the 20th century. Music had been available as a specialist subject before these changes; medicine was studied as a post-graduate subject.

Politicians from England and Wales

Politicians in other countries

Judges

Other lawyers

Civil servants and diplomats

References
Notes

Bibliography

 The Jesus College Record – annual publication. Cited in references as: JCR
  Cited in references as: Baker
  Volume 1: A–D, Volume 2: E–K, Volume 3: L–R, Volume 4: S–Z. Cited in references as: Foster, 1500–1714
  Cited in references as: Oxford Men
  Cited in references as: Members List
   Cited in references as: ODNB
  Cited in references as: Honours
  Cited in references as: Honours Supplement 1930
  Cited in references as: Honours Supplement 1950
  Cited in references as: Honours Supplement 1965
  Cited in references as: DWB
   Cited in references as: Who's Who
   Cited in references as: Who Was Who

External links
 List of notable Old Members, Jesus College website

Alumni Politics
Lists of people associated with the University of Oxford
Jesus College, Oxford
Jesus College, Oxford
Jesus College, Oxford